Kamar Aiken (born May 30, 1989) is a former American football wide receiver. He played college football at UCF and was signed by the Buffalo Bills as an undrafted free agent in 2011. He also played for the New England Patriots, Baltimore Ravens, Indianapolis Colts, and Philadelphia Eagles.

Early years
Aiken played high school football at Chaminade-Madonna in Hollywood, Florida.

Professional career

Buffalo Bills
Aiken was signed by the Buffalo Bills as an undrafted free agent in 2011. He was waived by the Bills on September 3, 2011 and was signed to the practice squad the next day. He was promoted to the active roster on November 22, 2011.

On August 31, 2012, Aiken was waived by the Bills and was signed to the practice squad the next day. He was released by the Bills on October 3, 2012.

Chicago Bears
Aiken was signed to the Chicago Bears practice squad on October 9, 2012. On November 6, Aiken was waived.

New England Patriots
On November 19, 2012, Aiken was signed to the New England Patriots' practice squad. On December 22, 2012 Aiken was promoted from the New England Patriots practice squad to the active roster, but was released two days later and re-signed to the practice squad. On December 29, 2012 Aiken was promoted back to the Patriots active roster. On August 26, 2013, he was released by the Patriots.

Baltimore Ravens
On October 30, 2013, Aiken was signed to the Baltimore Ravens' practice squad.

2014
Aiken scored for the first time in his career in a Week 6 game on October 12, 2014 against the Tampa Bay Buccaneers, catching a 17-yard touchdown pass. He helped quarterback Joe Flacco set the NFL record for the fastest time to record five touchdown passes (16:03). The Ravens won in a 48-17 blowout, and Aiken contributed with 2 catches for 20 yards.

In Week 14, in a game versus the Miami Dolphins Aiken caught a 13-yard touchdown pass and was a key factor in a 28-13 win, taking over for wide receiver Torrey Smith, who was not targeted in the game at all. He caught 6 passes for 65 yards. In a press conference that followed the game, Aiken made a comment that was directed at Smith: "I got you, bro."

In Week 17, Aiken caught a 2-yard touchdown pass to seal a win over the division rival Cleveland Browns, and the Ravens clinched the AFC's final playoff spot. Aiken's final stats for the game would be 2 receptions for 13 yards.

In the Divisional Round of the playoffs, the Ravens took on the number-one seeded New England Patriots, one of Aiken's former teams. Aiken scored the game's opening touchdown off a 19-yard pass from Flacco, his only catch of the game, but the Ravens lost to the eventual Super Bowl XLIX champions in a 35-31 shootout and had their season ended.

Aiken finished the 2014 season with 24 receptions, 267 receiving yards, and 3 touchdowns.

2015
In his second year after the departure of Torrey Smith, Aiken was expected to compete for a starting spot.  As a result of injuries to Steve Smith Sr., Breshad Perriman, Dennis Pitta, and Crockett Gilmore, he would end up being the Ravens' leading receiver during the year.

Aiken scored his first touchdown of the season in a Week 4 Thursday Night Football matchup with the division rival Pittsburgh Steelers. It was off a 15-yard catch. The Ravens would win the game 23-20 in overtime, giving them their first win of the season. Aiken was the game's leading receiver with 77 yards on 5 catches.

In Week 6, in a 25-20 loss to the San Francisco 49ers, Aiken had three catches for 22 yards and a 2-yard touchdown, which he caught while diving backwards in the endzone.

In a Week 11 game against the St. Louis Rams, Aiken scored his team's only touchdown off a 3-yard pass from Flacco (who would suffer a season-ending ACL injury towards the end of the game) in a 16-13 comeback win. Aiken would finish the game with 5 receptions for 50 yards.

The following week, in a Monday Night Football game against the Browns, Aiken would be a huge factor in a shootout game that came down to the wire, catching 6 passes for 80 yards and a 15-yard touchdown. On the final play of regulation, the Browns were in position for a game-winning field goal. Baltimore's Brent Urban would block a Travis Coons kick that would be recovered by Ravens' safety Will Hill and returned 64 yards for the game-winning touchdown.

In Week 15, the Ravens took on the Kansas City Chiefs. On the final play of the first half, the Ravens ran a Hail Mary play, due to their 17-point trailing deficit, in which quarterback Jimmy Clausen lofted a pass to Aiken, who caught the ball for a 48-yard touchdown and made the game 24-14 in favor of Kansas City heading into halftime. However, the Ravens would end up being shut out in the second half and suffer their second consecutive blowout loss by a score of 34-14. Aiken, however, was the  game's leading receiver, with 8 receptions (the biggest one being the unexpected touchdown) for 128 yards.

Aiken would finish the season as one of the few bright spots of an otherwise disappointing 5-11 campaign. He had a breakout season, leading the Ravens in receptions (75), receiving yards (944) and receiving touchdowns (5), while also committing one fumble, which he lost.

2016
During the 2016 offseason, the Ravens placed their second-round tender on Aiken, keeping him around for the 2016 season. He played in all 16 games with 6 starts, recording 29 receptions for 328 yards and one touchdown.

Indianapolis Colts
On March 21, 2017, Aiken signed with the Indianapolis Colts. He played in 15 games with seven starts, recording 15 receptions for 133 yards.

Philadelphia Eagles
On July 25, 2018, Aiken signed with the Philadelphia Eagles. He was released on September 1, 2018, but was re-signed 11 days later. He was released on October 19, 2018.

Career statistics

References

External links
 
 Indiana Colts bio

1989 births
Living people
American football wide receivers
UCF Knights football players
Sportspeople from Hollywood, Florida
Players of American football from Miami
Buffalo Bills players
Chicago Bears players
New England Patriots players
Baltimore Ravens players
Indianapolis Colts players
Philadelphia Eagles players
Chaminade-Madonna College Preparatory School alumni